Globke is a surname. Notable people with the surname include:

 Hans Globke (1898–1973), German lawyer, civil servant, and politician
 Rob Globke (born 1982), American ice hockey player